Bulls may refer to:
The plural of bull, an adult male bovine
Bulls, New Zealand, a small town in the Rangitikei District

Sports
Bucking bull, used in the sport of bull riding
Bulls (rugby union), a South African rugby union franchise operated by the Blue Bulls
Bulls (X-League), an American football team in Asaka, Saitama, Japan
Belfast Bulls, an American football team in Northern Ireland
Belleville Bulls, a junior ice hockey team in Ontario, Canada
Birmingham Bulls (American football), an American football team in the UK
Birmingham Bulls (ECHL), a defunct American ice hockey team from the East Coast Hockey League
Birmingham Bulls (WHA), a defunct American ice hockey team from the World Hockey Association and Central Hockey League
Birmingham Bulldogs or Birmingham Bulls, a British rugby league team
Bradford Bulls, a rugby league club in Bradford, England
Buffalo Bulls, the sports teams of the University at Buffalo
Buffalo Bulls football, college football team from Buffalo, New York
Buffalo Bulls men's basketball, men's basketball team from Buffalo, New York
Canterbury Bulls, a rugby league team in Christchurch, New Zealand
Chicago Bulls, a National Basketball Association team in Chicago, Illinois
Dundalk Bulls, an ice hockey team from Dundalk, Ireland
Durham Bulls, a minor league baseball team in Durham, North Carolina, United States
Gombe Bulls, a Nigerian basketball team
Jacksonville Bulls, a defunct American football team
Kapfenberg Bulls, a basketball team in Austria
Lethbridge Bulls, baseball team in the Western Canadian Baseball League
Louisville Bulls, a Mid Continental Football League team in Louisville, Kentucky
Pittsburgh Bulls, a defunct lacrosse team in the U.S. state of Pennsylvania
Queensland Bulls, an Australian cricket team
Bulls, the nickname of Spain's national Australian rules football team
Red Bull (Toro Rojo), nickname of Pichincha de Potosí, a Bolivian basketball team
South Florida Bulls, the sports teams of the University of South Florida
Windy City Bulls, a basketball team in Hoffman Estates, Illinois, United States
Zhejiang Golden Bulls, a Chinese basketball team in the CBA

See also
Blue Bulls, a rugby union club based in Pretoria, South Africa
Bulldog
Bulls Gap, Tennessee, a town in the United States
The running of the bulls
Bull (disambiguation)